The Pembrokeshire Historian: journal of the Pembrokeshire Local History Society was an annual English-language local history journal published by the Pembrokeshire Historical Society. It contains academic and general articles on historical and archaeological topics. In 1985 it was renamed Cylchgrawn Cymdeithas Hanesyddol Sir Benfro / Journal of the Pembrokeshire Historical Society.

The journal has been digitized by the Welsh Journals Online project at the National Library of Wales.

External links
 The Pembrokeshire Historian at Welsh Journals Online
 Cylchgrawn Cymdeithas Hanesyddol Sir Benfro / Journal of the Pembrokeshire Historical Society at Welsh Journals Online

English-language journals
Magazines published in Wales
Welsh history journals
History of Pembrokeshire